Baron Bernhard Karl von Köhne (Boris Vasilievich Kene; 1817 – 1887), director of the section for arms in the heraldic department of the Russian senate, and well known numismatist in imperial Russia. After falling out of favour with the scholarly circles in St. Petersburg, he applied for Finnish citizenship in 1859, but it was not granted.

Academics from the Russian Empire
Heraldists from the Russian Empire
Numismatists from the Russian Empire
1817 births
1887 deaths
Privy Councillor (Russian Empire)